The Campania regional election of 1975 took place on 15 June 1975.

Events
Christian Democracy was the largest party, while the Italian Communist Party came second. After the election, Christian Democrat Nicola Mancino was elected President of the Region, but as soon as in 1976 he was replaced by fellow Christian Democrat Gaspare Russo, to whom Ciro Cirillo succeeded in 1979.

Results

Source: Ministry of the Interior

1975 elections in Italy
1975 regional election
1975
June 1975 events in Europe